Charles Donald Bateman, known as Don Bateman, (born 8 March 1932, Saskatchewan, Canada) is an electrical engineer and the inventor of the Ground Proximity Warning System (GPWS), a device that is responsible for a marked decline in controlled flight into terrain accidents, such as the Mount Erebus Disaster with Air New Zealand Flight 901.

Bateman earned his degree in electrical engineering at the University of Saskatchewan before beginning a career at Sundstrand Corporation (later Honeywell).  Bateman spent most of his career as Chief Engineer, Flight Safety Avionics at Honeywell. Over his career, he developed innovative, cost-effective avionic flight systems. His most significant accomplishment is having pioneered the invention of the original Ground Proximity Warning System (GPWS) in the late 1960s. The United States now requires the installment of GPWS for turbine aircraft which carry six or more passengers. This technology has delivered Honeywell close to a billion dollars in revenue.

Bateman retired from Honeywell on July 21, 2016.

Scientific Work
While having over 40 U.S. and 80 foreign patents concerning aircraft terrain avoidance systems, head-up displays, speed control/auto throttle systems, stall warning systems, automatic aircraft flight control systems, and weight-and-balance systems, Bateman is most recognized for his invention of the original Ground Proximity Warning System (GPWS). With his team of Honeywell engineers, Bateman invented the original GPWS, and continues to improve these devices. Every five years his team “comes up with a new model, not because the technology had improved but because we knew we could make it better.” These advancements led to the creation of the Enhanced Ground Proximity Warning Systems (EGPWS). This program provides a better visualization than the GPWS did. At a glance, pilots can view a visual display of hazardous terrain below and ahead of the aircraft.

Ground proximity warning system (GPWS)
A series of aircraft crashes as a result of controlled flight into terrain (CFIT) led Bateman to take the initiative in creating a solution to these accidents. CFIT is defined as “where a pilot has the aircraft under control but unknowingly flies into terrain” This type of accident typically takes place during poor visibility. Bateman felt it was within his capabilities to construct a system that would detect hazardous terrain in the aircraft’s projected path.

Ground proximity warning system (GPWS) serves the purpose of alerting pilots if their aircraft is in danger of flying into hazardous terrain or the ground.

“In order to provide for the additional effectiveness of a ground proximity warning system during a landing approach, the waypoint signal of an Area Navigation System is used in combination with an altitude above-ground-signal to compute a minimum terrain altitude for each point along the aircraft's approach to the runway. The minimum altitude is compared with the aircraft's actual altitude and if it is below the minimum an alarm is activated.”

This paragraph is the abstract of the invention from its patent. It describes using a radar altimeter system to keep track of the aircraft’s height above ground. The system will sound an alarm if aircraft’s altitude is unsafe.

While this technology improved flight safety tremendously, it was still imperfect. It had two problems:
No Warning: The primary cause of CFIT occurrences with no GPWS warning is landing short. When the landing gear is down and landing flaps are deployed, the GPWS expects the airplane to land and therefore, issues no warning.
Late Warning or Improper Response: This was primarily caused by blind-spots within the terrain. A sudden change in altitude—a steep slope, for example—would receive a late warning and the pilot may be unable to avoid the obstacle. This problem was implicated in the Garuda Indonesia Flight 152 accident.

Enhanced GPWS
Bateman continued to head the development of the GPWS, developing it into the Enhanced Ground Proximity Warning Systems (EGPWS). This fixed the GPWS shortcomings by incorporating GPS into its analysis of the terrain. Now it is possible for EGPWS to predict the path of the aircraft and the terrain ahead of the aircraft for several miles. Digital terrain maps, featuring hazardous obstacles and features, warn the pilot when to pull up.

Additionally, with EGPWS, landing does not inhibit the performance of the system. In fact, the main focus now is making landing and departure safer, as they are the most dangerous aspects of flying.

Awards
Inducted into the National Inventors Hall of Fame (2005)
Industrial Research Institute Achievement Award (2001)
Awarded the Cumberbatch Trophy of GAPAN for a major personal contribution to the improvement of international air safety (1996)
Awarded the National Medal of Technology and Innovation (2010)
Awarded the Philip J. Klass Lifetime Achievement Award as part of its 56th Annual Honors, by Aviation Week & Space Technology magazine (2013)

Patents
Bateman holds more than 40 U.S. and 80 foreign patents concerning aircraft terrain avoidance systems, HUDs, speed control/autothrottle systems, stall warning systems, automatic flight control systems, and weight and balance systems. The earliest  for a HUD dates to 1972 when he was with United Controls. The latest,  for a cabin depressurization warning system, dates to 2008 with Honeywell.

The primary GPWS patent, Aircraft landing approach ground proximity warning system  dates to 1976, with Sundstrand Data.

Abstract: “In order to provide for the additional effectiveness of a ground proximity warning system during a landing approach, the waypoint signal of an Area Navigation System is used in combination with an altitude above-ground-signal to compute a minimum terrain altitude for each point along the aircraft's approach to the runway. The minimum altitude is compared with the aircraft's actual altitude and if it is below the minimum an alarm is activated.”

References

Phoenix: Honeywell's Don Bateman, inventor of EGPWS, to be inducted into national inventors hall of fame 11 February 2005 FreshNews.com
Bateman, D. C. (1 July 2001). "An engineer looks at innovation: How a small team of self-styled mavericks tackled the aviation industry’s top cause of fatal accidents." IRI Achievement Award Address, 44(4), 25-27.
Bateman, D. C. (1975). In Sundstrand Data Control, Inc. (Redmond, WA) (Ed.), Aircraft landing approach ground proximity warning system
Honeywell EGPWS Deliveries Reach 30,000 Units (19 July 2004) Business Wire
"National Inventors Hall of Fame announces 2005 inductees" 12 February 2005 Medical News Today Retrieved 28 March 2009
Gary Webb "Garuda crash lawsuit finally settled" (25 September 2003) Retrieved 28 March 2009
"Hall of Fame Inventor Profile: C. Donald Bateman" Invent.org Retrieved 28 March 2009

Aviation pioneers
People from Saskatchewan
Canadian inventors
1932 births
Living people